Jurij Zezulkin (born 16 August 1971) is a Belarus-born chess grandmaster (1999) who has played for Poland from 2010.

Chess career
In 1989 won Belarus Junior Chess Championship (U18). Jurij Zezulkin is multiple international tournaments winner or 1st place shared: Kraków (1990), Malmö (1992), Gothenburg (1992), Częstochowa (1996), Litomyšl (1997), Mielno (2002), Łeba (2002), Kołobrzeg (2003), Krynica-Zdrój (2009). In the years 2000, 2001, 2003, 2004 and 2005 five times won chess tournament Äskulap in Görlitz. In 2004 won tournament Porzellan Cup in Dresden.

Zezulkin now lives in Poland where he is an organizer of the chess festival Caissa Pol Tour.

References

External links
 
 
 

1971 births
Living people
Polish chess players
Chess grandmasters
Chess players from Minsk